
Gmina Kołaczyce is an urban-rural gmina (administrative district) in Jasło County, Subcarpathian Voivodeship, in south-eastern Poland.

Before 1 January 2010, when Kołaczyce became a town, the district was classed as a rural gmina.

Villages
Apart from the town of Kołaczyce, the gmina contains the villages of Bieździadka, Bieździedza, Krajowice, Lublica, Nawsie Kołaczyckie, Sieklówka and Sowina.

Neighbouring gminas
Gmina Kołaczyce is bordered by the town of Jasło and by the gminas of Brzostek, Brzyska, Frysztak and Jasło.

References
 Polish official population figures 2006

Kolaczyce
Jasło County